Men's 10 metre platform competition at the Beijing 2008 Summer Olympics was held from August 22 to August 23, at the Beijing National Aquatics Center. It was an individual diving competition, with dives performed from an inflexible platform, unlike the springboard used for three metre diving, ten metres above the surface of the water.

The individual diving competitions all consist of three rounds. In the first, the 30 divers each perform six dives. The top 18 divers advance to the semifinals. Each diver again performs six dives, and the top 12 divers from among those dives advance to the finals. Preliminary scores are ignored at this point, as only the semifinal scores are considered in advancement. In the final round, the divers perform a final set of six dives, with the scores from those dives, and only those dives, used to determine final ranking.

Seven judges evaluate each dive, giving the diver a score between 0 and 10 with increments of 0.5. The two highest and two lowest scores from the judges are dropped. The remaining three scores are summed, and then multiplied by the degree of difficulty of the dive to give the total score for the dive. Scores from each dive in the round are summed to give the round score.

Finals

At the finals, held on August 23, 2008, Zhou Luxin of China was leading in the points until his last dive, where an imperfect entry gave him merely 74.80 points. Subsequently, Matthew Mitcham of Australia very strongly executed a two and a half somersault with two and a half twists in the pike position, a dive with a very high degree of difficulty of 3.8. The seven judges scored Mitcham 9.0, 9.5, 9.5, 10, 10, 10 and 10 points, giving him 112.10 points for the dive, at that time the highest single dive score in Olympic history and surpassed only in 2021 by Yang Jian. Mitcham finished on 537.95 points and was awarded the gold medal, denying China a clean sweep of all of the diving gold medals. Zhou Luxin finished on 533.15 points, securing the silver. Gleb Galperin of Russia finished on 525.80 points, securing the bronze.

Results

References

 https://web.archive.org/web/20080828214148/http://results.beijing2008.cn/WRM/ENG/INF/DV/RPT/DVM001901.shtml
 http://sports.espn.go.com/oly/summer08/fanguide/sport?sport=dv

External links
 Video summary of men's 10m platform diving at the 2008 Summer Olympics

Diving at the 2008 Summer Olympics
2008
Men's events at the 2008 Summer Olympics